The 2019–20 Monmouth Hawks men's basketball team represented Monmouth University in the 2019–20 NCAA Division I men's basketball season. The Hawks, led by ninth-year head coach King Rice, played their home games at OceanFirst Bank Center in West Long Branch, New Jersey as members of the Metro Atlantic Athletic Conference. They finished the season 18–13 overall, 12–8 in MAAC play to finish in a tie for third place. Before they could face #5 seeded Quinnipiac in the MAAC tournament quarterfinals, all postseason tournaments were cancelled amid the COVID-19 pandemic.

Previous season
The Hawks finished the 2018–19 season 14–21 overall, 10–8 in MAAC play to finish in 6th place. In the MAAC tournament, they defeated Niagara, Quinnipiac, and Canisius before losing to Iona 81–60 in the championship game.

Roster

Schedule and results

|-
!colspan=12 style=| Non-conference regular season

|-
!colspan=9 style=| MAAC regular season

|-
!colspan=12 style=| MAAC tournament
|-

|-

Source

References

Monmouth Hawks men's basketball seasons
Monmouth Hawks
Monmouth Hawks men's basketball
Monmouth Hawks men's basketball